Huanghua is a city in Hebei, China.

Huanghua may refer to:

Huanghua, Changsha, Hunan, China
Huanghua, Hubei, a town in Yiling District, Hubei, China
Huanghua, a nickname of Empress Mu of China's Northern Qi Dynasty
Huanghuacheng, a village near the Great Wall of China, in Huairou, Beijing

See also
Huang Hua (disambiguation)